Marit Myrmæl (born 20 January 1954) is a Norwegian cross-country skier who competed during the early 1980s.

She won a bronze medal in the 4 × 5 km relay at the 1980 Winter Olympics in Lake Placid, New York. Myrmæl's best career finish was second at a 20 km event in Sweden in 1982.

In 1978 she won the silver medal at the Norwegian championships in 10 km cross-country running, representing Meldal IL. On the same distance she won one bronze medal (1977).

Cross-country skiing results
All results are sourced from the International Ski Federation (FIS).

Olympic Games
 1 medal – (1 bronze)

World Championships

World Cup

Season standings

Individual podiums

2 podiums

References

External links
 
 
 

1954 births
Living people
Norwegian female cross-country skiers
Olympic cross-country skiers of Norway
Olympic bronze medalists for Norway
Cross-country skiers at the 1976 Winter Olympics
Cross-country skiers at the 1980 Winter Olympics
Cross-country skiers at the 1984 Winter Olympics
Norwegian female long-distance runners
Olympic medalists in cross-country skiing
Medalists at the 1980 Winter Olympics